Trondhjemite is a leucocratic (light-colored) intrusive igneous rock. It is a variety of tonalite in which the plagioclase is mostly in the form of oligoclase. Trondhjemites that occur in the oceanic crust or in ophiolites are usually called plagiogranites.

Trondhjemite is common in Archean terranes occurring in conjunction with tonalite and granodiorite as the TTG (tonalite–trondhjemite–granodiorite) orthogneiss suite. Trondhjemite dikes also commonly form part of the sheeted dike complex of an ophiolite.

The rock type was first described by V.M. Goldschmidt in 1916. The name of the rock type is derived from the city of Trondheim, Norway.

Notes

References

Further reading
 Best, Myron G. (2002) Igneous and Metamorphic Petrology, Blackwell Publishing, 2nd ed. 

Igneous rocks
Igneous petrology
Granitic rocks